Manaraga is a peak in the northern Ural Mountains in Yugyd Va National Park, within the Komi Republic, in Russia.

Geography 
It is located 16.5 km west of Mount Narodnaya, the highest peak in the Ural mountains.

The slopes of the peak are gentle and grassy, but the summit is jagged and rocky. Manaraga translated from Nenets means "Bear Paw".

In culture  
Manaraga is the title of a novel by Vladimir Sorokin published in 2017.

See also 
 Yugyd Va National Park

References

Mountains of the Komi Republic
Ural Mountains
Highest points of Russian federal subjects
One-thousanders of Asia